Second Chances is the fourth album released by smooth jazz artist Jessy J. Released on September 10, 2013, it debuted at No. 2 on the Billboard Jazz Albums chart. The album features guest writers, co-producers and performances by Norman Brown, Jeff Lorber, Jimmy Haslip, Johnny Britt, and Joe Sample. In addition to eight original songs, Second Chances includes Jessy J's reimaging of classics by Roberta Flack "Feel Like Making Love" and Sergio Mendes' samba "Magalenha".

Track listing 
 "Listen 2 The Groove" (Jessy J, Jeff Lorber) – 4:58; feat. Jeff Lorber
 "Second Chances" (Jessy J, Johnny Britt) – 3:43; feat. Norman Brown
 "Feel Like Makin' Love" (Eugene McDaniels) – 3:35
 "Magalenha" (Carlinhos Brown) – 4:26
 "'Tango For Two" (Jessy J, Jeff Lorber, Jimmy Haslip) – 4:16
 "Dos" (Jessy J, Facundo Monty, Bryant Siono) – 4:14
 "La Luna Feliz" (Jessy J) – 3:25
 "Double Trouble" (Jessy J, Jeff Lorber) – 5:15; feat. Jeff Lorber & Jimmy Haslip
 "Mambo Gumbo" (Jessy J, Johnny Britt, Joe Sample) – 3:06; feat. Johnny Britt
 "Twice" (Jessy J, Johnny Britt) – 4:45

Personnel

Musicians 
 Jessy J – vocals (1, 3, 4, 7), tenor saxophone (1, 2, 4, 5, 7-10), arrangements (1-5, 7, 8, 10), flute (3, 4, 6, 7), alto saxophone (4), baritone saxophone (4, 9), soprano saxophone (6)
 Jeff Lorber – keyboards (1, 4, 5, 8), arrangements (1, 4, 5, 8), strings (3), guitars (4, 5, 8)
 Johnny Britt – additional vocals (1), vocal arrangements (1), vocals (2, 9, 10), keyboards (2, 10), drum programming (2, 10), trumpet (2), arrangements (2, 10)
 Norman Jackson – keyboards (3, 7, 9), strings (7)
 Dwight Sills – guitars (1)
 Norman Brown – guitar (2)
 Michael Angel – rhythm guitar (2), guitars (10)
 Tim Stewart – guitars (3, 7, 9), arrangements (3)
 Michael Thompson – guitars (4, 5, 8)
 Facundo Monty – guitar (6), vocals (6)
 Jimmy Haslip – bass (1, 4, 5, 8), backing vocals (4), arrangements (4, 5, 8)
 Frank Abraham – bass (2, 10)
 Bryant Siono – bass (3, 6, 7, 9), keyboards (6), electric guitar (6)
 Anthony Moore – drums (1, 5)
 Charles Streeter – drums (3, 6, 7, 9), percussion (7, 9)
 Michael White – drums (4)
 Richie Gajate-Garcia – percussion (2, 10)
 Nancy Lyons – chorus vocals (4)
 Eric Mondragon – backing vocals (7)

Production 
 Jessy J – producer 
 Jeff Lorber – producer (1, 4, 5, 8), recording (1, 4, 5, 8), mixing (1, 4, 5, 8)
 Johnny Britt – producer (2, 10), recording (2, 9, 10)
 Jimmy Haslip – producer (4, 5, 8)
 Facundo Monty – producer (6)
 Bryant Siono – recording (3, 6, 7, 9), producer (6)
 Seth Presant – recording (2-10)
 Dave Rideau – mixing (2, 3, 6, 9, 10)
 David Darlington – mastering at Bass Hit Studios (New York City, New York)
 Lorien Babajian – package design 
 Tom Keller – photography 
 Stewart Coxhead and International Music Management – management

References

External links
http://www.billboard.com/artist/304571/jessy-j/biography

2013 albums
Jessy J albums
Heads Up International albums